Ease Your Mind may refer to:

Songs
"Ease Your Mind", by Status Quo from Blue for You, 1976
"Ease Your Mind", by Gallliano from 4, 1996
"Ease Your Mind", by the Sunshine Band, 1998
"Ease Your Mind", by Wide Mouth Mason from Stew, 2000
"Ease Your Mind", by Goapele from Even Closer, 2002
"Ease Your Mind", by Los Amigos Invisibles from The Venezuelan Zinga Son, Vol. 1, 2002
"Ease Your Mind", by Matthew Mayfield from Breathe Out in Black, 2010
"Ease Your Mind", by Blu & Exile from Give Me My Flowers While I Can Still Smell Them, 2012
"Ease Your Mind", from Soundman Vol. 1

Other uses
Ease Your Mind, a 2005 album by Sioen